Ischikauia steenackeri is a species of cyprinid fish endemic to Lake Biwa in Japan. This species was originally described as Opsariichthys steenackeri. This species is the only member of its genus.

References

Sources
 

Cultrinae
Monotypic fish genera
Cyprinid fish of Asia
Freshwater fish of Japan
Endemic fauna of Japan
Taxa named by David Starr Jordan
Taxa named by John Otterbein Snyder